The Kingdom of Batwal was a petty kingdom in the confederation of 24 states known as Chaubisi Rajya. Batwal was part of Kingdom of Palpa, it became independent, however, it was later merged back in 1710 after the first King Binayak Sen's grandson had no children. In 1804, Batwal was annexed by the Gorkhas.

References 

Chaubisi Rajya
Butwal
Butwal
History of Nepal
Butwal
19th-century disestablishments in Nepal